Javier Carpio Martín (born 6 April 1984) is a Spanish professional footballer who plays as a right back for Palencia CF.

Club career
Born in Salamanca, Castile and León, Carpio was an UD Salamanca youth graduate. After making his debut as a senior with the reserves in the 2003–04 season, he moved to Deportivo Alavés in 2004.

Carpio appeared for the Basques' C and B teams during his tenure, the latter competing in the Segunda División B. Subsequently, he joined Tercera División club Mazarrón CF in 2006. 

After a one-year spell at Pinatar CF also in the fourth level, Carpio signed for division three side CD Alcoyano. He was an undisputed starter in his two seasons, missing out on play-off promotion in both of them.

On 23 July 2010, Carpio was presented at Elche CF from Segunda División. He played his first match as a professional on 28 August at the age of 26, coming on as a late substitute for Jordi Xumetra in a 1–0 home win against Recreativo de Huelva.

First-choice in his debut campaign at the Estadio Manuel Martínez Valero, Carpio eventually lost his spot to new signing Javier Flaño in the second. Subsequently, he was released.

Carpio joined SD Ponferradina of the same league in summer 2012. After three years as a regular starter, he moved to Deportivo Alavés also in the second tier. He contributed 34 appearances during the season, helping to a return to La Liga after a ten-year absence.

On 16 July 2016, Carpio joined Cádiz CF still in the second division. He moved down a tier in January 2019, agreeing to a contract at Salamanca CF UDS.

Honours
Alavés
Segunda División: 2015–16

References

External links
 
 
 
 
 
 
 

1984 births
Living people
Sportspeople from Salamanca
Spanish footballers
Footballers from Castile and León
Association football defenders
Segunda División players
Segunda División B players
Tercera División players
Divisiones Regionales de Fútbol players
Tercera Federación players
Deportivo Alavés B players
Pinatar CF players
CD Alcoyano footballers
Elche CF players
SD Ponferradina players
Deportivo Alavés players
Cádiz CF players
Salamanca CF UDS players
21st-century Spanish people